The 1982 IIHF European U18 Championship was the fifteenth playing of the IIHF European Junior Championships.

Group A
Played in Ängelholm and Tyringe, Sweden from March 29 to April 4, 1982.

First round 
Group 1
Poland should have participated in this group but withdrew, instead a Swedish under 17 team took their place, not participating in the championship competition. They lost to the Soviets 8-3, Finland 5-4, and beat Switzerland 9-0.

Group 2

Final round 
Championship round

Placing round

The Swedish under 17 team beat the West Germans 7-2 and the French 18-2.
Poland were relegated to Group B for 1983.

Tournament Awards
Top Scorer  Petr Rosol (13 points)
Top Goalie: Dominik Hašek
Top Defenceman:Alexei Gusarov
Top Forward: Tomas Sandström

Group B
Played in Sofia, Bulgaria from March 17–24, 1982

First round
Group 1

Group 2

Final round 
Championship round

Placing round

Norway were promoted to Group A, and Yugoslavia were relegated to Group C, for 1983.

Group C
Played in Durham, England, United Kingdom from March 18–25, 1982

Hungary was promoted to Group B for 1983.

References

Complete results

Junior
IIHF European Junior Championship tournament
Sports competitions in Sofia
1980s in Sofia
Sports competitions in Ängelholm
IIHF European U18 Championship
IIHF European U18 Championship
International ice hockey competitions hosted by Sweden
International ice hockey competitions hosted by Bulgaria
1981–82 in Swedish ice hockey
1981–82 in Bulgarian ice hockey
Sport in Durham, England
20th century in County Durham
1981–82 in British ice hockey
International ice hockey competitions hosted by the United Kingdom
Ice hockey competitions in England